Pedro Flores may refer to:

Pedro Flores (composer) (1894–1979), Puerto Rican composer
Pedro Flores (boxer) (born 1951), Mexican world boxing champion
Pedro Flores Garcia (1897–1967), Spanish painter
Pedro Flores (inventor) (1896–1963), Filipino American who developed the modern yo-yo
Pedro Flores (bishop) (died 1540)